Karl Gustaf Ragnvald "Niggern" Josefsson-Reinsell (16 February 1916 – 16 April 1983) was a Swedish footballer. He competed in the men's tournament at the 1936 Summer Olympics. He was a part of the AIK team that won the 1936–37 Allsvenskan.

References

External links
 
 

1916 births
1983 deaths
Swedish footballers
Sweden international footballers
Olympic footballers of Sweden
Footballers at the 1936 Summer Olympics
Footballers from Stockholm
Association football forwards
AIK Fotboll players